Ivan Nikolayevich Onufriyev (born 6 August 1967) is a former Russian football player.

References

1967 births
Living people
Soviet footballers
FC Tyumen players
FC Uralets Nizhny Tagil players
FC Dynamo Stavropol players
Russian footballers
Russian Premier League players

Association football defenders